Story of a Poor Young Man (Spanish:La novela de un joven pobre) is a 1942 Argentine historical drama film directed by Luis Bayón Herrera and starring Hugo del Carril, Santiago Gómez Cou and Nélida Bilbao. It is based on the 1858 French novel of the same title by Octave Feuillet, which was later adapted again in 1968. The film's sets were designed by Juan Manuel Concado. It was released during what is considered to be the Golden Age of Argentine Cinema.

Synopsis
In the 1850s a young man returns to his family home in Buenos Aires to discover that his father is financially ruined.

Cast
 Hugo del Carril 
 Santiago Gómez Cou
 Nélida Bilbao 
 Alberto Terrones
 Consuelo Abad 
 Armando Bó 
 Elda Dessel 
 Francisco Pablo Donadio
 Francisco López Silva
 Carlos Perelli
 Julio Scarcella

References

Bibliography 
 Goble, Alan. The Complete Index to Literary Sources in Film. Walter de Gruyter, 1999.

External links 

1942 films
Argentine historical drama films
1940s historical drama films
1940s Spanish-language films
Films directed by Luis Bayón Herrera
Films set in Buenos Aires
Films set in the 1850s
Films based on French novels
Films scored by Alejandro Gutiérrez del Barrio
Argentine black-and-white films
1942 drama films
1940s Argentine films